Sarafanovskaya is a rural locality (a village) in Gorodishchenskoye Rural Settlement, Nyuksensky District, Vologda Oblast, Russia. The population was 40 as of 2002.

Geography 
Sarafanovskaya is located 43 km south of Nyuksenitsa (the district's administrative centre) by road. Verkhneye Kamennoye is the nearest rural locality.

References 

Rural localities in Nyuksensky District